Thomas J. Bowles was a member of the Wisconsin State Assembly from Utica, Winnebago County, Wisconsin.

Biography
Bowles was born on May 2, 1822 in Milan, Ohio. During the American Civil War, he served with the 8th Wisconsin Volunteer Infantry Regiment of the Union Army. Conflicts he took part in include the Battle of Nashville.

Political career
Bowles was a member of the Assembly during the 1881 and 1882 sessions. Other positions he held include member of the County Board of Winnebago County, Wisconsin. He was a Republican.

References

People from Milan, Ohio
People from Winnebago County, Wisconsin
County supervisors in Wisconsin
Republican Party members of the Wisconsin State Assembly
People of Wisconsin in the American Civil War
Union Army soldiers
1822 births
Year of death missing
People from Utica, Winnebago County, Wisconsin